Hannah Lee Fox (born September 29, 1969), better known as Hannah Fox is a former female boxer. She is from Las Vegas, Nevada. Her nickname is "The Vegas", which made her name sound like "Hannah The Vegas Fox" when introduced to fans before a fight.

Her first professional fight came on December 26, 1997, when she beat Heidi Tide by a decision in four, in Las Vegas. On her second fight, January 23 of 1998, she got her first knockout win, finishing her fight with Teara Anne Sanders in the first round.

Fox won her next seven fights in a row, with two knockouts. Among her foes during that initial, nine fight winning streak, were Tide in a rematch, Julie Birdsell, who antagonized Fox on Fox's first fight outside Nevada, with Fox winning an eight round decision at Biloxi, Mississippi, and the well known fighters, Diana Dutra, and Dawn George.

On January 15, 1999, she suffered her first, and only, career loss, when outpointed by Fredia Gibbs over eight rounds in Las Vegas. Fox, however, kept on the rise after this defeat: she had set her mind on one goal, and that was to become a world boxing champion.

After the loss to Gibbs came a rematch with Dutra, and Fox defeated the young hopeful, this time by a unanimous six round decision. Then, she fought Glenda Watkins, beating her by another six round decision, and becoming the IFBA's number one ranked challenger for the IFBA's world Jr. welterweight title.

On June 11, 1999, at Bossier City, Louisiana, she challenged Leah Mellinger for Mellinger's world Jr. Welterweight championship. Fox became the IFBA's world Jr. Welterweight champion by defeating Mellinger by a ten round decision.

With her dream finally accomplished, Fox retired, and has not made an attempt at a comeback.

Her boxing record was 12 wins, with only 1 loss, and 3 knockout wins.

Professional boxing record

References 

1969 births
American women boxers
Living people
People from the Las Vegas Valley
Boxers from Nevada
Super-featherweight boxers
21st-century American women